In histopathology, hobnailing is the presence of smooth projections from an epithelial surface, which generally contain nuclei. Hobnailing is seen in clear cell ovarian adenocarcinoma, collecting duct carcinoma, and in end-stage cirrhosis.

References 

Tissues (biology)